The Birth of the World is a 1925 painting by the Catalonian-Spanish artist Joan Miró (1893-1983) held in the permanent collection of the Museum of Modern Art (MOMA) in New York City. The work is oil on canvas and its dimensions are  8' 2 3/4" x 6' 6 3/4" (250.8 x 200 cm).  In 2019 the MOMA organized an eponymous exhibition of Miro's works curated around and including the canvas to offer a comparison between other major pieces by the artist and this seminal canvas.

The MOMA has described the process behind the creation of the work by stating that "Here Miró applied paint to an unevenly primed canvas in an unorthodox manner—pouring, brushing, and flinging—so that the paint soaked into the canvas in some places while resting on the surface in others. On top of this relatively uncontrolled application of paint, he added schematic lines and seemingly familiar shapes--a bird or kite, shooting star, balloon, and figure with white head--planned in preparatory studies. Miró once said that The Birth of the World describes "a sort of genesis," an amorphous beginning out of which life may take form".

References

1925 paintings
Paintings by Joan Miró